Chkhorots'q'u (Çxoroċqus municiṗaliṫeṫi) is a district of Georgia, in the region of Samegrelo-Zemo Svaneti. Its main town is Chkhorots'q'u.

Population: 22,309 (2014 census)

Area: 619 km2

Politics
Chkhorotsqu Municipal Assembly (Georgian: ჩხოროწყუს საკრებულო) is a representative body in Chkhorotsqu Municipality, consisting of 27 members which is elected every four years. The last election was held in October 2021. Dato Gogua of Georgian Dream was re-elected mayor in a tight 2nd round against a candidate of the United National Movement. Chkhorotsqu was one of only seven municipalities where ruling Georgian Dream party failed to secure a majority. After several attempts, the opposition parties UNM, For Georgia and Lelo agreed on a chair of the Sakrebulo, but key party For Georgia denied it formed a coalition with any of the other parties.

Administrative divisions
Chkhorotsqu municipality is divided into one borough (დაბა, daba) and 12 villages (სოფელი, sopeli):

Boroughs
 Chkhorotsqu

Villages
 Mukhuri
 Zumi
 Taia
 Khabume
 Kveda chkhorots'q'u
 Lesich'ine
 Lets'urts'ume
 K'irtskhi
 Nak'iani
 Akhuti
 Napichkhovo
 Ch'ogha

See also 
 List of municipalities in Georgia (country)

References

Notes

External links 
 Districts of Georgia, Statoids.com

Municipalities of Samegrelo-Zemo Svaneti